Jeremiah Dixon FRS (27 July 1733 – 22 January 1779) was an English surveyor and astronomer who is best known for his work with Charles Mason, from 1763 to 1767, in determining what was later called the Mason–Dixon line.

Early life and education
Dixon was born in Cockfield, near Bishop Auckland, County Durham, in 1733, one of seven children, to George Dixon, a coal mine owner, and Mary Hunter, a native of Newcastle who was said to have been "the cleverest woman" to ever marry into the Dixon family. Dixon became interested in astronomy and mathematics during his education at Barnard Castle. Early in life he made acquaintances with the eminent intellectuals of Southern Durham: mathematician William Emerson, and astronomers John Bird and Thomas Wright.

Career
It was probably the astronomer John Bird, an active Fellow of the Royal Society, who recommended Dixon as suitable to serve as assistant to Charles Mason in 1761 when the Royal Society sent them to observe the transit of Venus from Sumatra. However, their passage to Sumatra was delayed, and they landed instead at the Cape of Good Hope where the transit was observed on 6 June 1761. Dixon returned to the Cape once again with Nevil Maskelyne's clock to work on experiments with gravity.

Dixon and Mason signed an agreement in 1763 with the proprietors of Pennsylvania and Maryland, Thomas Penn and Frederick Calvert, sixth Baron Baltimore, to assist with resolving a boundary dispute between the two provinces. They arrived in Philadelphia in November 1763 and began work towards the end of the year. The survey was not complete until late 1766, following which they stayed on to measure a degree of Earth's meridian on the Delmarva Peninsula in Maryland, on behalf of the Royal Society. They also made a number of gravity measurements with the same instrument that Dixon had used with Maskelyne in 1761. Before returning to England in 1768, they were both admitted to the American Society for Promoting Useful Knowledge, in Philadelphia.

Dixon sailed to Norway in 1769 with William Bayly to observe another transit of Venus. The two split up, with Dixon at Hammerfest Island and Bayly at North Cape, in order to minimize the possibility of inclement weather obstructing their measurements. Following their return to England in July, Dixon resumed his work as a surveyor in Durham.

Private life
Dixon died unmarried in Cockfield on 22 January 1779, and was buried in an unmarked grave in the Quaker cemetery in Staindrop. Although he was recognised as a Quaker, he was known to break the rules by dressing in a long red coat and occasionally drinking to excess.

Legacy
It is possible that Dixon's name was the origin for the nickname Dixie used in reference to the U.S. Southern States, even though he was affiliated with the Northern side of the line.

Jeremiah Dixon is one of the two title characters of Thomas Pynchon's 1997 novel Mason & Dixon.  The song Sailing to Philadelphia from Mark Knopfler's album of the same name, also refers to Mason and Dixon, and was inspired by Pynchon's book.

An exhibition about the life and work of Jeremiah Dixon was mounted at the Bowes Museum in Barnard Castle in England in 2013. Titled Jeremiah Dixon: Scientist, Surveyor and Stargazer, it was scheduled to run from 27 April to 6 October.

In September 2013, a locomotive operating on the Weardale Railway in County Durham was named after Jeremiah Dixon. The locomotive now operates in the Willesden area of northwest London.

See also
Mason–Dixon line
Star Gazers' Stone

References

External links
 Mason and Dixon Line Preservation Partnership – Information about Jeremiah Dixon and the Mason and Dixon Line
 The Diary Junction Blog

18th-century British astronomers
English surveyors
Fellows of the Royal Society
Transit of Venus
People from Cockfield, County Durham
English Quakers
1733 births
1779 deaths